Khamisoides is a genus of spiders in the family Oonopidae. It was first described in 2015 by Platnick & Berniker. , it contains 3 species from the Virgin Islands.

References

Oonopidae
Araneomorphae genera
Spiders of the Caribbean